The Waynesburg Formation is a coal, sandstone, and siltstone geologic formation in West Virginia and Pennsylvania. It preserves fossils dating back to the Permian period.

Description
The Waynesburg Formation has a complicated history with the name being assigned to up to six different stratigraphic units. It consists of a basal coal bed, an unnamed sandstone member formerly called the Waynesburg Sandstone, and a sandy siltstone member. The basal coal member is considered mineable.

See also

 List of fossiliferous stratigraphic units in West Virginia

References
 

Permian West Virginia
Permian geology of Pennsylvania
Permian geology of Virginia